Zhejiang Loong Airlines Co. Ltd, branded as Loong Air and previously as CDI Cargo, is a Chinese airline based in Hangzhou Xiaoshan International Airport in Hangzhou, Zhejiang.

History 
Loong Airlines was originally a cargo airline named CDI Cargo Airlines, which started services in 2012 with one Boeing 737-300F freighter. It was approved to become a passenger airline by the Civil Aviation Administration of China and started domestic services in 2013. On 25 September 2013, the airline signed a memorandum of understanding with Airbus for the purchase of 20 Airbus A320 twin-engined aircraft. Its first flight started on 29 December 2013 from Hangzhou to Chongqing and Hangzhou to Shenzhen.

Destinations 

Sources:

Fleet

, Loong Air fleet consists of the following aircraft:

* The airline has an MoU with Airbus for the purchase of 11 Airbus A320ceo and 9 Airbus A320neo.

** The airline has a letter of intent with Airbus for the purchase of 20 A220s.(previously Bombardier CSeries)

See also

Transportation in China

References

Airlines established in 2012
Transport in Hangzhou
Companies based in Hangzhou
Airlines of China
Chinese brands
Chinese companies established in 2012